Anodonthyla hutchisoni is a species of microhylidae frog. This species is native to Madagascar and can be found in lowland rain forests.

References

Anodonthyla
Amphibians described in 2007